Bryan Gordon is an American film and television director, writer and producer who is primarily known for directing comedy television shows.

Early life 
Gordon was born and raised in Dover, Delaware.  He graduated from Dover High School. He graduated from the University of Delaware in 1969. He is Jewish.

Career 
After college, Gordon moved to New York City and started his career as a comedy writer on the ABC late night variety show Fridays in the early 1980s. He became an independent filmmaker, writing and directing the Academy Award-winning short film Ray’s Male Heterosexual Dance Hall (1987). His other film directing credits include his full-length directorial debut Career Opportunities (1991), written by John Hughes and starring Frank Whaley and Jennifer Connelly and Pie in the Sky (1996) starring Josh Charles, Anne Heche and  John Goodman. 

Gordon has directed episodes on such TV series as Grace and Frankie, The Office, Weeds, Studio 60 on the Sunset Strip, The West Wing, Ally McBeal, Boston Public, Sports Night (also starring Josh Charles), Curb Your Enthusiasm (created, written by and starring Larry David, Gordon's co-worker on Fridays), Freaks and Geeks and The Wonder Years.

He has directed numerous television pilots — among them One Tree Hill — setting the look and design for the series.  He directed and produced the TBS pilot The Wedding Band that premiered in 2012.  Also in 2012, he directed the 30 for 30 documentary short for ESPN, "The Arnold Palmer", which was nominated for a Sports Emmy for Outstanding New Approaches Sports Programming in 2013.

In 2009 and 2010, he directed and produced the series Party Down for the Starz Network. In 2015, he co-created, executive produced, and directed Yahoo Screen original series Sin City Saints.

Honors and awards
Gordon has been nominated three times for the Directors Guild of America Award. In 2002, he received its Award for Outstanding Directing for a Comedy Series.

He also been nominated for an Emmy Award twice — both for his work on the HBO series Curb Your Enthusiasm, which he directed numerous episodes over its entire run.

He is a member of his alma mater the University of Delaware’s Wall of Fame.

Personal life
Bryan Gordon is married to filmmaker Jessie Nelson. They reside in Los Angeles and have a daughter, actress Molly Gordon (born c. 1995).

Filmography

Film

Television

Acting Work

References

External links

American male film actors
American male television actors
American television directors
American television producers
American television writers
American male television writers
University of Delaware alumni
Living people
Place of birth missing (living people)
Year of birth missing (living people)
Directors Guild of America Award winners
People from Dover, Delaware
Film directors from Delaware
Screenwriters from Delaware